Francis Joseph Spellman (May 4, 1889 – December 2, 1967) was an American prelate of the Catholic Church. From 1939 until his death in 1967, he served as the sixth Archbishop of New York; he had previously served as an auxiliary bishop of the Archdiocese of Boston from 1932 through 1939. He was created a cardinal in 1946.

Early life and education

Francis Spellman was born in Whitman, Massachusetts, to William Spellman (1858–1957) and Ellen (née Conway) Spellman. His father was a grocer whose own parents had emigrated to the United States from Clonmel and Leighlinbridge in Ireland. The eldest of five children, Spellman had two brothers, Martin and John, and two sisters, Marian and Helene. As a child, he served as an altar boy at Holy Ghost Church.

Spellman attended Whitman High School (now Whitman-Hanson Regional High School) because there was no local Catholic school. He enjoyed photography and baseball; he was a first baseman during his first year of high school until a hand injury forced him to stop playing, and later managed the team. Following his high school graduation, Spellman entered Fordham University in New York City in 1907. He graduated in 1911 and decided to study for the priesthood. He was then sent by Archbishop William Henry O'Connell to study at the Pontifical North American College in Rome.

During his years in Rome, Spellman befriended such figures as Gaetano Bisleti, Francesco Borgongini Duca and Domenico Tardini. He suffered from pneumonia, however, leaving his state of health so poor that the seminary administration wanted to send him home. He nevertheless remained and managed to complete his theological studies.

Priesthood
Spellman was ordained a priest by Patriarch Giuseppe Ceppetelli on May 14, 1916. Upon his return to the United States, he did pastoral work in the Archdiocese of Boston. Cardinal O'Connell, who had earlier sent Spellman to Rome, took an apparent dislike to the young priest. William Cardinal O'Connell referred to him as a "little popinjay" and later said, "Francis epitomizes what happens to a bookkeeper when you teach him how to read." Spellman served a series of relatively insignificant assignments.

Following the United States' entry into World War I in 1917, Spellman applied to become a military chaplain in the Army but did not meet the height requirement. Spellman's comparable application to the Navy was personally rejected, twice, by the Assistant Secretary of the Navy, Franklin D. Roosevelt. Finally, O'Connell assigned him to promote subscriptions for the archdiocesan newspaper, The Pilot, instead. He was named assistant chancellor in 1918 and in 1924 archivist of the Archdiocese. After translating into English two books written by his friend Borgongini Duca, Spellman was made the first American attaché of the Vatican Secretariat of State in 1925. He also worked with the Knights of Columbus in running children's playgrounds in Rome, and was raised to the rank of Privy Chamberlain on October 4, 1926, by Pope Pius XI.

During a trip to Germany in 1927, Spellman established a lifelong friendship with Archbishop Eugenio Pacelli, who was serving as Apostolic Nuncio. He translated Pius XI's first broadcast over Vatican Radio in 1931. Later that year, Spellman was charged with smuggling Non abbiamo bisogno, the papal encyclical condemning Benito Mussolini, out of Rome to Paris, where he then delivered it to the press; he was subsequently attacked by Italian newspapers. He also served as secretary to Cardinal Lorenzo Lauri at the 1932 International Eucharistic Congress in Dublin, and helped reform the Vatican's press office, introducing mimeograph machines and issuing press releases.

Episcopal career

Auxiliary Bishop of Boston
On July 30, 1932, Spellman was appointed Auxiliary Bishop of Boston and Titular Bishop of Sila by Pope Pius XI. He had originally been considered for the Dioceses of Portland, Maine, and Manchester, New Hampshire. He received his consecration on the following September 8 from Pacelli (wearing the vestments Pacelli wore when he was consecrated by Benedict XV), with Archbishops Giuseppe Pizzardo and Francesco Borgongini Duca serving as co-consecrators, at St. Peter's Basilica. His was the first consecration of an American bishop ever held at St. Peter's. Borgongini-Duca designed for him a coat of arms incorporating Columbus's ship the Santa Maria. Pope Pius XI gave him the motto Sequere Deum (to follow God).

After his return to the United States, Spellman resided at St. John's Seminary in Brighton, Massachusetts. He was later made pastor of Sacred Heart Church in Newton Centre; there he erased the church's $43,000 debt through different fundraising activities. When his mother died in 1935, her funeral was attended by Governor James Curley, Lieutenant Governor Joseph Hurley, and many members of the clergy, with the exception of O'Connell.

In the autumn of 1936, Cardinal Pacelli came to the United States, visiting New York City, Washington, D.C., Boston, Saint Paul, MN, and Chicago. The ostensible purpose of the trip was personal; he was to be the guest of Genevieve Brady, the wealthy widow of Nicholas Brady. However, during the trip Pacelli met with Roosevelt to discuss diplomatic recognition of the sovereignty of Vatican City. Spellman was present at the meeting, which he arranged to take place at the president's boyhood home at Hyde Park, New York, on November 5, 1936, two days after his reelection to a second term.

Pacelli also looked into "the radio priest" Father Charles Coughlin of Detroit. Though an early supporter of Roosevelt, Coughlin became increasingly disenchanted with him and made increasingly sharp national radio attacks on Roosevelt and the New Deal. He also expressed sympathy for the governments of Hitler and Mussolini as opponents of Communism. The Catholic hierarchy for its part did not like Coughlin. The Vatican and the Apostolic Legation in Washington, D.C. wanted him silenced. Spellman worked with Joseph P. Kennedy and Pacelli to stop Coughlin. However, only Coughlin's superior, Bishop Michael Gallagher of Detroit, had the canonical authority to curb him, and Gallagher supported Coughlin. Coughlin was in Boston at the same time as Pacelli, but they did not meet. In 1939, Coughlin was finally forced off the air under rules adopted by the Code Committee of the National Association of Broadcasters.

Archbishop of New York

Following the death of Pope Pius XI, Pacelli was elected as Pope Pius XII, and one of his first acts was to appoint Spellman the sixth Archbishop of New York on April 15, 1939. He succeeded the late Cardinal Patrick Joseph Hayes, and was formally installed as Archbishop on the following May 23. He was painted twice in 1940 and again in 1941 by the prominent Roman Catholic Swiss-born American artist Adolfo Müller-Ury.  The first regularly scheduled Masses in Spanish in New York began when Spellman gave authorization to the Redemptorists at St. Cecilia's parish in East Harlem.

In addition to his duties as diocesan bishop, he was named Apostolic Vicar for the U.S. Armed Forces on December 11, 1939. He spent many Christmases with American troops in Japan, Korea and Europe in this capacity.

During his tenure in New York, Spellman's considerable national influence in religious and political matters earned his residence the nickname of "the Powerhouse". He hosted such prominent figures as Joseph P. Kennedy Sr., Bernard Baruch, David I. Walsh, John William McCormack, and numerous other politicians, entertainers, and clergymen. In 1945, he instituted the Al Smith Dinner, an annual white tie fundraiser for Catholic Charities of the Archdiocese which is attended by prominent national figures, including presidential nominees.

Following his promotion to New York, Spellman also became a close confidant of President Roosevelt.  During World War II, he was chosen by Roosevelt to act as the latter's agent and visit Europe, Africa, and the Middle East in 1943, visiting a total of 16 countries in four months. As archbishop and a military vicar, he would have greater freedom than official diplomats. Spellman also acted as a liaison between Pope Pius XII and Roosevelt in the Pope's attempts to have Rome declared an open city, in order to save it from the relentless bombing other European capitals had suffered and potentially destroying Rome's historical sites and ruins, including Vatican City. In 1946, he received The Hundred Year Association of New York's Gold Medal Award "in recognition of outstanding contributions to the City of New York".

Cardinal

Pope Pius XII created him Cardinal-Priest of Santi Giovanni e Paolo in the consistory of February 18, 1946; his titular church was the same one held by Pius before his election to the papacy.

According to historian William V. Shannon, "Spellman was deeply reactionary in his theology and secular politics."  Vehemently anti-Communist, Spellman once said that "a true American can neither be a Communist nor a Communist condoner" and that "the first loyalty of every American is vigilantly to weed out and counteract Communism and convert American Communists to Americanism". Spellman defended Senator Joseph McCarthy's 1953 investigations of Communist subversives in the federal government, stating at an April 1954 breakfast attended by the Senator that McCarthy had "told us about the Communists and about Communist methods" and that he was "not only against communism—but ... against the methods of the Communists". In 1949, when gravediggers at Calvary Cemetery in Queens went on strike for a pay raise, the Cardinal accused them of being Communists and recruited seminarians of the Archdiocese from St. Joseph's Seminary as strikebreakers. He described the actions of the gravediggers, who belonged to the Food, Tobacco, Agricultural, and Allied Workers Union of America, as "an unjustified and immoral strike against the innocent dead and their bereaved families, against their religion and human decency". The strike was supported by such figures as the religious activist (now Servant of God) Dorothy Day and Ernest Hemingway, who wrote a scathing letter to Spellman.

Spellman denounced the efforts of Congressman Graham Arthur Barden to provide federal funding only to public schools as "a craven crusade of religious prejudice against Catholic children", even calling Barden himself an "apostle of bigotry". The cardinal engaged later in a heated public dispute with former First Lady Eleanor Roosevelt in 1949 when she expressed her opposition to providing federal funding to parochial schools in her column, My Day. In response, Spellman accused her of anti-Catholicism and called her column a "[document] of discrimination unworthy of an American mother". He eventually met with her at her Hyde Park home to quell the dispute.

Spellman frequently criticized films he perceived to be immoral or indecent. He described Two-Faced Woman as "an occasion of sin ... dangerous to public morals", The Miracle (which led to Joseph Burstyn, Inc v. Wilson) as a "vile and harmful picture ... a despicable affront to every Christian", and Baby Doll as "revolting" and "morally repellent". His condemnation of Forever Amber caused producer William Perlberg to publicly refuse to "bowdlerize the film to placate the Roman Catholic Church".

He was instrumental in getting William Brennan appointed to the Supreme Court in 1956, but would later regret the decision. Justice William O. Douglas once said, "I came to know several Americans who I felt had greatly dishonored our American ideal. One was Cardinal Spellman."

Spellman participated in the 1958 papal conclave, which elected Pope John XXIII. He was considered dismissive of Pope John and is reported to have said, "He's no Pope. He should be selling bananas." In 1959, he served as papal delegate to the Eucharistic Congress in Guatemala; during his journey, he stopped in Nicaragua and, contrary to the Pope's orders, publicly appeared with dictator Anastasio Somoza Debayle.

According to Catholic journalist Raymond Arroyo's foreword written for a 2008 edition of Fulton Sheen's autobiography, Treasure in Clay: The Autobiography of Fulton J. Sheen, "It is widely believed that Cardinal Spellman drove Sheen off the air." Besides being pressured to leave television, Sheen also "found himself unwelcome in the churches of New York City. Spellman cancelled Sheen's annual Good Friday sermons at St. Patrick's Cathedral and discouraged clergy from befriending the Bishop."

Although John F. Kennedy was a Catholic, Spellman supported Richard Nixon in the 1960 presidential election, due to Kennedy's opposition to federal aid for parochial schools and to appointing a U.S. Ambassador to the Holy See. His support for Nixon ended a long partnership with Kennedy's father, Joseph P. Kennedy Sr. Kennedy aide David Powers recalled that in 1960, Kennedy asked him "Why is Spellman against me?", to which he replied, "Spellman is the most powerful Catholic in the country. When you become president, you will be." Spellman had previously presided over the weddings of Robert, Jean, Eunice and Ted Kennedy.

Historian Pat McNamara views Spellman's outreach to the city's growing Puerto Rican community as years ahead of its time. He sent priests overseas to study Spanish, and by 1960 a quarter of all the archdiocese's parishes had an outreach to Spanish-speaking Catholics. In his years as a cardinal Spellman built 15 churches, 94 schools, 22 rectories, 60 convents, and 34 other institutions. He also visited Ecuador, where he founded three schools: Cardinal Spellman High School and Cardinal Spellman Girls' School, both in Quito; and Cardinal Spellman High School in Guayaquil. All of these schools are still currently open.

Second Vatican Council
Spellman attended the Second Vatican Council from 1962 to 1965, and sat on its Board of Presidency.  The cardinal believed that predominantly liberal clergymen were being appointed to the council's commissions, and opposed the introduction of vernacular into the Mass, saying, "The Latin language, which is truly the Catholic language, is unchangeable, is not vulgar, and has for many centuries been the guardian of the unity of the Western Church." A theological conservative, he supported ecumenism on pragmatic grounds. However, in April 1963 Spellman brought to the Second Vatican Council John Courtney Murray as a peritus (expert) despite Cardinal Ottaviani's well-known animosity towards him. With Apostolic Delegate to the U.S. Archbishop Egidio Vagnozzi attempting to silence Murray, Spellman, along with Murray's Jesuit superiors, continued to shield him from most attempts at Curial interference. Murray's work helped shape the council's declaration on religious freedom.

Growing revolution
Spellman, following the death of John XXIII, participated in the conclave of 1963, which resulted in the election of  Pope Paul VI. When The Deputy, a controversial play about Pius XII's actions during the Holocaust, opened on Broadway in 1964, Spellman condemned the play as "an outrageous desecration of the honor of a great and good man". The play's producer, Herman Shumlin, responded by calling Spellman's words a "calculated threat to really drive a wedge between Christians and Jews".

Although he once expressed his personal opposition to demonstrations during the civil rights movement, Spellman declined J. Edgar Hoover's requests to condemn Martin Luther King Jr., while also funding the trip of a group of New York priests and Religious Sisters to the 1965 Selma to Montgomery marches. He opposed racial discrimination in public housing but also the social activism of such priests as Daniel Berrigan and his brother, Philip Berrigan, as well as a young Melkite priest, David Kirk.

Lyndon Johnson and Vietnam
During the 1964 presidential election, Spellman supported Lyndon B. Johnson, whose Higher Education Facilities Act and Economic Opportunity Act had greatly benefited the Church. The Cardinal later agreed to Johnson's requests to send priests to the Dominican Republic to defuse anti-American sentiments following the invasion of 1965.

Spellman was an outspoken supporter of the Vietnam War, to the extent that the conflict became known as "Spelly's War" and the Cardinal as the "Bob Hope of the clergy". He met Ngo Dinh Diem in 1950 and, favorably impressed by his strongly Catholic and anti-Communist views, promoted his career; however, he disassociated from Diem before the latter's assassination in 1963. Fearful of Communist gains in Vietnam, Spellman had urged American intervention since late 1954, but by the 1960s his views were strongly criticized by antiwar activists and even his fellow religious leaders.

When Pope Paul VI visited the United States in October 1965, he indirectly rebuked Spellman's hawkish stance by pleading for peace before the United Nations. A group of college students protested outside his residence in December 1965 for suppressing antiwar priests, and he later spent that year's Christmas with troops in South Vietnam. While in Vietnam, Spellman quoted Stephen Decatur in declaring, "My country, may it always be right, but right or wrong, my country". He also described Vietnam as a "war for civilization" and "Christ's war against the Vietcong and the people of North Vietnam". One priest accused Spellman of "[blessing] the guns which the pope is begging us to put down". In January 1967, antiwar protestors disrupted a Mass at St. Patrick's Cathedral. His support for the Vietnam War, along with his opposition to church reform, greatly undermined Spellman's clout within the church and country.

Spellman was awarded the Sylvanus Thayer Award by the United States Military Academy at West Point, New York, in 1967. Illustrator Edward Sorel designed a poster in 1967 titled Pass the Lord and Praise the Ammunition, showing Spellman carrying a rifle with bayonet, but the poster was never distributed because Spellman died right after it was printed.

Later life and death
In 1966, Spellman offered his resignation to Pope Paul VI after the latter instituted a policy whereby bishops retire at age 75, but Paul VI asked him to remain in his post. He led his archdiocese through an extensive period of building the Catholic infrastructure, particularly the construction of numerous churches, schools, and hospitals. He consolidated all parish building programs into his own hands, thereby getting better interest rates from bankers, and convinced Pius XII of the need to internationalize the Vatican's Italy-centered investments after World War II; for his financial skill, he was sometimes called "Cardinal Moneybags".

Spellman died in New York City on December 2, 1967, at age 78, and was interred in the crypt under the main altar at St. Patrick's Cathedral. His funeral Mass was attended by President Johnson, Vice President Hubert Humphrey, Robert F. Kennedy, Jacob Javits, Nelson Rockefeller, John Lindsay, Arthur Goldberg, and Greek Orthodox Archbishop Iakovos. To date, Spellman's twenty-eight year tenure as archbishop is the longest in the history of the Archdiocese of New York.

Homosexuality

John Cooney published a 1984 biography of Spellman entitled The American Pope.  Before publication, he circulated galley proofs of the book, which included several pages arguing that Spellman had been a homosexual, based on multiple anonymous sources.  This draft of the book was covered in the press.  However, the final published version removed this material, replacing it with two sentences:  "For years rumors abounded about Cardinal Spellman being a homosexual.  As a result, many felt – and continue to feel – that Spellman the public moralist may well have been a contradiction of the man of the flesh."

Journalist Michelangelo Signorile describes Spellman as "one of the most notorious, powerful and sexually voracious homosexuals in the American Catholic Church's history."  Signorile reported that Cooney's manuscript initially contained interviews with several people with personal knowledge of Spellman's homosexuality, including researcher C. A. Tripp. According to Signorile, the Catholic Church pressured Cooney's publisher, Times Books, to reduce the four pages discussing Spellman's sexuality to a single paragraph.  Both Signorile and John Loughery cite a story suggesting that Spellman was sexually active and carrying on a relationship with a male member of the chorus in the Broadway revue One Touch of Venus.

Additionally, Curt Gentry, biographer of J. Edgar Hoover, says that Hoover's files also had "numerous allegations that Spellman was a very active homosexual."

Legacy
Russell Shaw states that Spellman "embodied the fusion of Americanism and Catholicism" in the mid-twentieth century. Spellman's support of John Courtney Murray contributed to Murray's significant influence on the drafting of Dignitatis humanae, the Second Vatican Council's Declaration on Religious Freedom. "Spellman's enduring accomplishments were his personal acts of kindness toward individuals and the religious and charitable institutions he founded or strengthened."

Henry Morton Robinson's novel The Cardinal (1950) was based in part on Spellman's career that was made in 1963 into a film of the same name with Tom Tryon as the eventual Cardinal. 

In July 1947, a Jesuit residential building opened on the campus of Fordham University, Spellman's alma mater, named in his honor.

See also

 Cardinal Spellman High School (Brockton, Massachusetts)
 Cardinal Spellman High School (The Bronx, New York City)
 Catholic Church hierarchy
 Catholic Church in the United States
 Spellman Museum of Stamps & Postal History
 Historical list of the Catholic bishops of the United States
 List of Catholic bishops of the United States: military service
 Lists of patriarchs, archbishops, and bishops

Notes

Works cited 
 Cardinal Spellman High School. n.d. "An Historical Sketch of Cardinal Spellman High School".
 Catholic Hierarchy (unofficial website). n.d. "Francis Joseph Cardinal Spellman".
 
 DeMarco, Donald. "800,000 Saved by Pius XIIs Silence" . National Catholic Register, May 18, 1998.
 Dugan, George. "Huge Fund to Oust McCarthy Reported". The New York Times, 1954-11-08.
 Epstein, Alessandra. 2001. "Rebel with a Cause". 201 Magazine. Boston University, College of Communication.
 National Portrait Gallery. Pass the Lord and Praise the Ammunition (description). Image of the satirical poster of Cardinal Spellman produced in 1967 by Edward Sorel.
 Gannon, Robert I. The Cardinal Spellman Story. New York, 1962.
 Loughery, John. 1998. The Other Side of Silence: Men's Lives and Gay Identities: A Twentieth Century History. Henry Holt.
 Miranda, Salvador. 1998. The Cardinals of the Holy Roman Church. "Spellman, Francis Joseph".
 The New York Times. 1984, August 4. "New book on Cardinal Spellman stirs controversy".
 O'Donnell, Edward T. "Spellman leads crusade against communism". Irish Echo Online, 82(44), November 4–10, 2009.
 Quinn, Peter. "New York's Catholic Century" (essay). The New York Times, 2006-06-04.
 Roosevelt, Eleanor (2004). Neal, Steve (ed.). Eleanor & Harry: The Correspondence of Eleanor Roosevelt and Harry S. Truman.
 Signorile, Michelangelo. "Cardinal Spellman's Dark Legacy". New York Press, 2002-05-07.
 Thornton, Francis Beauchesne. 1963. Our American Princes: The Story of the Seventeen American Cardinals. Putnam. (Chapter on Spellman pp. 201ff.)
 Time. July 13, 1931. "Everything Is Promised".
 Time. August 15, 1932. "Boston's Bishop".
 Time. September 19, 1932. "Crosier & Mitre".
 Time. June 7, 1943. "Odyssey for the Millennium".
 Time. March 14, 1949. "Strike in the Graveyard".

 Time. November 5, 1959. "Cardinal's Birthday".
 Time. December 8, 1967. "The Master Builder" (obituary of Cardinal Spellman).

External links 

 Archdiocese for the Military Services, USA, official website
 Archdiocese for the Military Services of the United States. GCatholic.org. Retrieved August 20, 2010.
 FBI file on Cardinal Spellman
 Roman Catholic Archdiocese of New York, official website

1889 births
1967 deaths
20th-century American cardinals
American anti-communists
American military chaplains
American Philatelic Society
American Roman Catholic clergy of Irish descent
Burials at St. Patrick's Cathedral (Manhattan)
Cardinals created by Pope Pius XII
Catholics from Massachusetts
Fordham University alumni
Knights of Malta
Participants in the Second Vatican Council
People from Whitman, Massachusetts
Pontifical North American College alumni
Pope Pius XII advisers
Roman Catholic archbishops of New York
Whitman-Hanson Regional High School alumni